Kalyanachandra (reigned c. 975 – 1000) was the third ruler of the Chandra dynasty in eastern Bengal. His campaign against the Kamboja dynasty of northern Bengal allowed the resurgent Pala Emperor Mahipala I to reclaim much of the Pala Empire. He was also the father of Buddhist patron Atiśa.

References 

 
 

Chandra kings
10th-century rulers in Asia